The Pardita Norte leaf-toed gecko (Phyllodactylus partidus) is a species of gecko. It is endemic to Isla Partida in Mexico.

References

Phyllodactylus
Reptiles of Mexico
Reptiles described in 1966